The Prosecutor v. Milan Martić was a case (no. IT-95-11-I) brought before the International Criminal Tribunal for the Former Yugoslavia concerning war crimes committed during the Croatian War of Independence against non-Serbs.

Events leading to the trial
Martić was born near Knin (present-day Republic of Croatia) on 18 November 1954. From January 1991 to August 1995, he held various positions within the government of the Serbian Autonomous Region of Krajina, which later evolved into the Republic of Serbian Krajina (RSK), including Chief of the Police in Knin, Secretary for Internal Affairs of the SAO Krajina, Deputy Commander of the Territorial Defense of the SAO Krajina, Minister of Defense of the SAO Krajina, Minister of the Interior of the SAO Krajina and of the RSK and, from 25 January 1994 onwards, President of the RSK.

The events giving rise to this trial took place between August 1991 and December 1995 in the SAO Krajina and the RSK. The Trial Chamber found that Martić participated in a joint criminal enterprise (JCE) with other individuals, the common purpose of which was the establishment of an ethnically Serb territory through the displacement of the non-Serb population.

Martić participated in the JCE by providing substantive financial, logistical and military support to the SAO Krajina and the RSK, by actively working together with the other JCE participants to fulfill the objective of a united Serb state, by exercising his authority over the Ministry of Internal Affairs (MUP) of the SAO Krajina and the RSK, by fuelling an atmosphere of insecurity and fear through public statements, and by participating in the forcible removal of the non-Serb population.

Trial court
The trial lasted for 143 days. During the trial the prosecution called 45 witnesses and had 901 exhibits. The defense presented 22 witnesses and had 90 exhibits. The Trial Chamber concluded that Martić incurred individual criminal responsibility pursuant to Article 7(1) of the Tribunal's Statute ("Statute"). Martić was convicted of the following crimes:

Count 1, persecution as a crime against humanity;
Count 3, murder as a crime against humanity;
Count 4, murder as a violation of the laws or customs of war;
Count 5, imprisonment as a crime against humanity;
Count 6, torture as a crime against humanity;
Count 7, inhumane acts as a crime against humanity;
Count 8, torture as a violation of the laws or customs of war;
Count 9, cruel treatment as a violation of the laws or customs of war;
Count 10, deportation as a crime against humanity;
Count 11, forcible transfer as a crime against humanity;
Count 12, wanton destruction of villages or devastation not justified by military necessity as a violation of the laws or customs of war;
Count 13, destruction or willful damage done to institutions dedicated to education or religion as a violation of the laws or customs of war; and
Count 14, plunder of public or private property as a violation of the laws or customs of war. The Trial Chamber concluded that the crimes fell within the common purpose of the JCE, or were "foreseeable to Martić", and convicted Martić under the basic form of JCE for Counts 10, 11, and 1 (in part) and under the extended form of JCE for Counts 3 to 9, 12 to 14 and 1 (in part).   The Trial Chamber acquitted Martić of Count 2, extermination as a crime against humanity.

The Trial Chamber further found that Martić ordered the shelling of Zagreb on 2 and 3 May 1995 with Orkan Rockets, containing cluster munitions. It held that he incurred individual criminal responsibility pursuant to Article 7(1) of the Statute for ordering under Count 15, murder as a crime against humanity; Count 16, murder as a violation of the laws or customs of war; Count 17, inhumane acts as a crime against humanity; Count 18, cruel treatment as a violation of the laws or customs of war; and Count 19, attacks on civilians as a violation of the laws or customs of war. The Trial Chamber did not enter convictions under Counts 16 and 18, having found that these crimes were impermissibly cumulative with Count 19. The Trial Chamber sentenced Martić, in absentia, to a single sentence of thirty-five years imprisonment.

On 8 March 1996, the Trial Chamber issued a decision confirming the initial indictment and issuing an international arrest warrant for Martić which was sent to all States and to the NATO-led Implementation Force (IFOR) that was in Bosnia and Herzegovina at the time.

Martić surrendered in May 2002. He was transferred on 15 May 2002 to the ICTY in The Hague. On 21 May 2002, during his initial appearance, and then again on 23 January 2003 he pleaded not guilty to all the charges held against him in the indictment. The trial commenced before the ICTY on 13 December 2005.

Appeals Chamber
The Appeals Chamber of the ICTY accepted appeals from both Martić and the Prosecutor. The Defense requested a finding of not guilty or a re-trial on the basis of alleged errors of law and fact. The Prosecution presented one ground of appeal, asking for a revision of the sentence due to an alleged error of law. Appeals hearings took place on 25–26 June 2008. The Appeals Chamber dismissed nine grounds of Martić's appeal and accepted two sub-grounds of the fifth ground of appeal, reversing Martić's convictions relating to specific alleged crimes committed in Benkovac, Cerovljani, Vukovići, and Poljanak.

The Appeals Chamber rejected Martić's argument that the Trial Chamber erred in failing to take into account relevant contextual factors, in particular, the political objectives of the Serb leadership. The Appeals Chamber granted the Prosecution's sole ground of appeal in which it claimed that the Trial Chamber erred in law when it found that persons hors de combat, i.e., soldiers who are incapable of taking part in the hostilities (for example because injured or detained), could not be victims of crimes against humanity. The Appeals Chamber concluded that the reversals on appeal did not warrant a reduction in sentence. On 8 October 2008 the Appeals chamber upheld the Trial Chamber's ruling. In June 2009 he was transferred to Tartu Vangla prison in Estonia serve out his sentence.

References

 "Milan Martic Case Information Sheet." Case Information Sheet. ICTY. 12 Oct. 2008 http://www.icty.org/case/martic/4
 Prosecutor v. Milan Martić, No. IT-95-11-I (International Criminal Tribunal for the Former Yugoslavia March 8, 1996).
 Van Schaack, Beth, and Ronald C. Slye. International Criminal Law and Its Enforcement. New York, NY: Foundation P, 2007. 247–54.
 Statute of the International Tribunal for the Prosecution of Persons Responsible for Serious Violations of International Humanitarian Law Committed in the Territory of the Former Yugoslavia since 1991, U.N. Doc. S/25704 at 36, annex (1993) and S/25704/Add.1 (1993), adopted by Security Council on 25 May 1993, U.N. Doc. S/RES/827 (1993).
 Romande, Loterie. "Trial Watch: Milan Martić." Trial Watch. 10 Oct. 2008. TRIAL. 12 Oct. 2008 <http://www.trial-ch.org/en/trial-watch/profile/db/legal-procedures/milan_Martić_562.html>.

Martic, Milan
Croatian War of Independence